Oksana Vasylivna Livach (born 14 May 1997 in Dolyna, Ivano-Frankivsk Oblast, Ukraine) is a Ukrainian freestyle wrestler. She is a member of Spartak Lviv sports club. She is a bronze medalist of the 2018 World Championships and 2019 European champion.

In 2021, she won the silver medal in her event at the Poland Open held in Warsaw, Poland. She competed in the 50kg event at the 2022 World Wrestling Championships held in Belgrade, Serbia.

References

External links
 

1997 births
Living people
Ukrainian female sport wrestlers
People from Dolyna
World Wrestling Championships medalists
Wrestlers at the 2019 European Games
European Games medalists in wrestling
European Games silver medalists for Ukraine
European Wrestling Championships medalists
Wrestlers at the 2020 Summer Olympics
Sportspeople from Ivano-Frankivsk Oblast
Olympic wrestlers of Ukraine
21st-century Ukrainian people

Births in Dolyna